Baroness, Karoline Henriette Susanne Friederike von Feuchtersleben (full name: Karoline Henriette Susanne Friederike von Feuchtersleben; 12 October 17741842), was a German noblewoman and Lady-in-waiting to Princess Charlotte of Saxe-Hildburghausen.

Life
She was born as a daughter of Adjunct General of Ernest Frederick I, Duke of Saxe-Hildburghausen, Christoph von Feuchtersleben and his wife Rosalie Marie. They were of an old Saxon noble family. 

From 1798 she held the position of Lady-In-Waiting to Princess, Charlotte von Hildburghausen and because of this developed a close romantic relationship with writer Jean Paul who was invited to Hildeburghausen by Princess Charlotte. In July 1799 Paul declared his love for Feuchtersleben in a letter and in October of the same year both became secretly engaged, this engagement didn't last long when von Feuchtersleben's mother wasn't happy with her marrying someone of a lower class and income. 

In October 1817, Karoline von Feuchtersleben married Karl Christoph von Grundherr von Altenthann (1777 – 1831), from one of the oldest patrican families, who was four years her junior. Karl was a Ducal Saxony-Hildburghausen Legation Counselor, a tutor to Princes George, Friedrich and Eduard von Hildburghausen, later Higher Regional Court and Consistorial Counselor

She died in 1842 in Hildeburghausen.

Note

von Feuchtersleben Family

1774 births
1842 deaths